Akodon is a genus consisting of South American grass mice. They mostly occur south of the Amazon Basin and along the Andes north to Venezuela, but are absent from much of the basin itself, the far south of the continent, and the lowlands west of the Andes. Akodon is one of the most species-rich genera of Neotropical rodents. Species of Akodon are known to inhabit a variety of habitats from tropical and tropical moist forests to altiplano and desert. Fossils are known from the late Pliocene onwards.

Taxonomy
Akodon is the largest genus in the tribe Akodontini. Three of its synonyms—Chalcomys, Hypsimys, and particularly Microxus—have sometimes been regarded as distinct genera. Neomicroxus was separated in 2013. Previously associated with  Akodon, the genera  Abrothrix, Deltamys, Necromys, Thalpomys, and Thaptomys are currently recognized as distinct. Some species of the tribe Abrotrichini are called akodons.

The genus contains the following species:
Akodon aerosus
Akodon affinis
Akodon albiventer
Akodon azarae
Akodon boliviensis
Akodon budini
Akodon caenosus
Akodon cursor
Akodon dayi
Akodon dolores
Akodon fumeus
Akodon glaucinus
Akodon iniscatus
Akodon juninensis
Akodon kofordi
Akodon lindberghi
Akodon lutescens
Akodon mimus
Akodon molinae
Akodon mollis
Akodon montensis
Akodon mystax
Akodon neocenus
Akodon orophilus
Akodon paranaensis
Akodon pervalens
Akodon philipmyersi
Akodon polopi
Akodon reigi
Akodon sanctipaulensis
Akodon serrensis
Akodon siberiae
Akodon simulator
Akodon spegazzinii
Akodon subfuscus
Akodon surdus
Akodon sylvanus
Akodon tartareus
Akodon toba
Akodon torques
Akodon varius

Footnotes

References

Literature cited
Braun, J.K., Coyner, B.S., Mares, M.A. and Van Den Bussche, R.A. 2008. Phylogenetic relationships of South American grass mice of the Akodon varius group (Rodentia, Cricetidae, Sigmodontinae) in South America. Journal of Mammalogy 89(3):768-777.
Braun, J. K., M. A. Mares, B. S. Coyner, and R. A. Van Den Bussche. 2010. New species of Akodon (Rodentia: Cricetidae: Sigmodontinae) from central Argentina. Journal of Mammalogy, 91(2):387–400.
D'Elía, G., Jayat, J.P., Ortiz, P.E., Salazar-Bravo, J. and Pardiñas, U.F.J. 2011. Akodon polopi Jayat et al., 2010 is a senior subjective synonym of Akodon viridescens Braun et al., 2010 (first page). Zootaxa 2744:62–64.
Jayat, J.P., Ortiz, P.E., Salazar-Bravo, J., Pardiñas, U.F.J. and D'Elía, G. 2010. The Akodon boliviensis species group (Rodentia: Cricetidae: Sigmodontinae) in Argentina: species limits and distribution, with the description of a new entity (abstract). Zootaxa 2409:1–61.
Musser, G.G. and Carleton, M.D. 2005. Superfamily Muroidea. Pp. 894–1531 in Wilson, D.E. and Reeder, D.M. (eds.). Mammal Species of the World: a taxonomic and geographic reference. 3rd ed. Baltimore: The Johns Hopkins University Press, 2 vols., 2142 pp. 
Pardiñas, U.F.J., D'Elía, G., Cirignoli, S. and Suarez, P. 2005. A new species of Akodon (Rodentia, Cricetidae) from the Northern Campos grasslands of Argentina. Journal of Mammalogy 86(3):462–474.
Pardiñas, U.F.J., Teta, P., D'Elía, G. and Diaz, G.B. 2011. Taxonomic status of Akodon oenos (Rodentia, Sigmodontinae), an obscure species from West Central Argentina (abstract). Zootaxa 2749:47–61.

 
Rodent genera